Avalanche is a 1923 Austrian silent drama film directed by Michael Curtiz, and produced by Arnold Pressburger. The film's sets were designed by the art director Julius von Borsody.

Cast
 Victor Varconi as George Vandeau
 Mary Kid as Marie Vandeau
 Walter Marischka as The Child
 Lilly Marischka as Kitty
 Mathilde Danegger as Jeanne Vandeau

See also
 Michael Curtiz filmography

Bibliography
 Alan K. Rode. Michael Curtiz: A Life in Film. University Press of Kentucky, 2017.

External links

1923 films
Austrian black-and-white films
Austrian silent feature films
Films directed by Michael Curtiz
Films produced by Arnold Pressburger
Films set in the Alps
Avalanches in film